The Canadian Conservatory of Music was a music conservatory in Ottawa, Ontario, Canada that was actively providing higher education in music during the first half of the 20th century.

History
Founded by Harry Puddicombe in 1902,  the school was located on Bay Street. The building was designed by Edgar Lewis Horwood.
Puddicombe's brother-in-law, Donald Heins, founded the conservatory's student orchestra in 1903 which eventually became Ottawa's first professional orchestra in 1910, the Ottawa Symphony Orchestra (no relation to the current orchestra of that name). Some of the schools notable pupils and faculty members include composers Joseph Beaulieu, Gladys Ewart, Johana Harris, Bill Richards, and Herbert Sanders; and pianists Yvon Barette, Annie Jenkins, and Hélène Landry. The school closed in 1937, when the school's building was acquired by the municipality of Ottawa to meet the expanding public school systems needs.

References

See also
:Category:Canadian Conservatory of Music faculty

Classical music in Canada
Music of Ottawa
Education in Ottawa
Educational institutions established in 1902
Educational institutions disestablished in 1937
Music schools in Canada
1902 establishments in Canada